Cosmocampus darrosanus (D’Arros pipefish or whiteface pipefish) is a species of marine fish of the family Syngnathidae. It is found in the Western Indian Ocean, Sri Lanka, Indonesia, Guam, and the Great Barrier Reef (Australia). This species is ovoviviparous, with males carrying eggs before giving birth to live young.

Etymology
The specific name is taken from the type locality of D'Arros Island in the Amirante Islands.

References

Further reading

WoRMS
iNaturalist

darrosanus
Marine fish
Taxa named by Charles Eric Dawson
Taxa named by John Ernest Randall
Fish described in 1975